LeechFTP is a multi-threaded freeware FTP client by Jan Debis.

History
LeechFTP was originally written in Delphi 3 and released on 2 March 1998. Updates to the program added features such as file drag & drop, resuming downloads, and thread-by-thread bandwidth throttling. The final release, version 1.3 build 207, was made public on 16 April 1999. By the end of development, add-on language packs were available in 19 languages, besides the default English.

BitBeamer
After ceasing development of LeechFTP, Debis moved on to develop a commercial trialware FTP client called BitBeamer, expanding on LeechFTP's features and reusing some of the code from LeechFTP.  Development ended in 2001 after BitBeamer 1.0 Build 2025. Though it is still downloadable from some websites, it is no longer possible to register the trial version of BitBeamer even with a paid license, and therefore not possible to use the program after the 30-day trial period expires.

See also
Comparison of FTP client software

References

External links
 Archive of LeechFTP website, from the Wayback Machine.

FTP clients
Pascal (programming language) software